Goliath and the Dragon is a 1960 international co-production sword-and-sandal film starring Mark Forest and Broderick Crawford. The name of the main character was changed from Hercules to Emilius (known in the film as Goliath) for release in North America by American International Pictures to sell it as a sequel to their earlier Goliath and the Barbarians (1959).

American International Pictures had announced plans to create a "sequel" to Goliath and the Barbarians called Goliath and the Dragon based on a script by Lou Rusoff for star Debra Paget, but the project fell through, so they bought the rights to an already-made Italian film called Revenge of Hercules and retitled it Goliath and the Dragon. American International Pictures changed the hero's name from "Hercules" to "Emilius" ("Goliath") and added a Wah Ming Chang stop-motion animation sequence inserting a dragon sub-plot into the story.  The dragon sequence is only in the Americanized English-dubbed print, not in the original Italian version.

Plot
The film begins with Hercules/Goliath entering the underworld and defeating several monsters including Cerberus to retrieve the blood diamond of the goddess of vengeance. It is later revealed that king Eurystheus has sent Hercules on this task to ensure his death to gain allies who after Hercules' death will join the king in an attack on Thebes. The episode is loosely based on the twelfth of the Labours of Hercules.

Hercules returns to his wife Deianira to find that his teenaged son (his brother in the American version) Hyllus is in love with Thea the daughter of a king that Hercules believes murdered his family. The enraged Hercules refuses to let Hyllus have anything to do with Thea. The scheming Eurystheus has convinced Hyllus that Thea is really in love with Hercules rather than him and concocts a plan where a jealous Hyllus will murder his own brother. A slave girl Alcinoe gives Hyllus a poison to give to Hercules that she says is merely a potion to have Hercules fall out of love with Thea. Eurystheus himself wishes to marry Thea and install her as his queen.

The plan is aborted through a sympathetic goddess of the Wind who relays Thea's warning. Hyllus attempts to rescue Thea but is captured. When Hercules rides to rescue Hyllus he saves the life of Alcinoe who is menaced by a bear. Ilus is to be executed with others in a public display by being crushed by an elephant in a crowded arena. Hercules rescues him.

On their return home the two are given a prophecy that Hyllus will become a king but at the cost of the life of the woman who loves Hercules. Hercules destroys his home and leaves with his family to try and avert the prophecy. Deianira offers her life to the gods in order to fulfil the prophecy for Hyllus. She is carried off by a centaur corresponding with Nessus who Hercules mortally wounds.

The centaur is able to bring his captive Deianira to his friend Eurystheus who intends firstly to let her be killed by his dragon, then to act as a hostage against the vengeance of Hercules.

Cast
 Mark Forest – Hercules/Goliath
 Broderick Crawford – King Eurystheus
 Sandro Moretti – Hyllus
 Gaby André – Ismene
 Philippe Hersent – Androclo
 Leonora Ruffo – Deianira
 Giancarlo Sbragia – Tindaro
 Wandisa Guida – Alcinoe
 Federica Ranchi – Thea
 Carla Calò – Sibyl
 Ugo Sasso – Timocleo
 Claudio Undari –  Centaur
 Salvatore Furnari – Midget

Release
Goliath and the Dragon was released in Italy on 12 August 1960 where it was released as La vendetta di Ercole. It was released in the United States  as Goliath and the Dragon in November 1960. The American version of the film was edited by Salvatore Billitteri and Maurizio Lucidi and had new music by Les Baxter.

Reception
The film is listed in Golden Raspberry Award founder John Wilson's book The Official Razzie Movie Guide as one of the 100 Most Enjoyably Bad Movies Ever Made.

References

Bibliography

External links

1960 animated films
1960 films
1960s fantasy films
Italian fantasy films
Peplum films
Films about Heracles
Films based on classical mythology
Films set in ancient Greece
1960s stop-motion animated films
Films about dragons
Sword and sandal films
1960s Italian films